The 2021 Pan American Archery Championships took place in Monterrey, Mexico, from 22 to 28 March 2021.

Medal summary

Recurve

Compound

Medal table

References

Pan American Archery Championships
Pan American Archery Championships
Pan American Archery Championships
International archery competitions hosted by Mexico
Pan American Archery Championships